Wells County is a county in the U.S. state of North Dakota. As of the 2020 census, the population was 3,982. Its county seat is Fessenden.

History
The Dakota Territory legislature created the county on January 4, 1873. Its government was not organized at that time, nor was it attached for administrative or judicial purposes to another county. It was named Gingras County; this name continued until February 26, 1881, when the name was changed to Wells County, named for Edward Payson Wells, a Jamestown banker, early promoter of the James River Valley, and member of the legislature in 1881.

The county government was organized on August 28, 1884, with Sykeston as the county seat. In 1894 the county seat was transferred to Fessendon. The county boundary was altered in 1883 when a parcel was transferred to Foster County, and again in 1885 when it received land from Foster County. Its boundary has remained unchanged since 1885.

Geography
The James River flows east-northeasterly through Wells County. The county terrain consists of rolling hills with occasional protuberances, dotted with lakes and ponds in its SW portion. The terrain slopes to the east and north; its highest point is a protuberance near the southwestern corner, at 2,182' (665m) ASL.

Major highways

  U.S. Highway 52
  North Dakota Highway 3
  North Dakota Highway 15
  North Dakota Highway 30
  North Dakota Highway 91
  North Dakota Highway 200
 County 1
 County 5
 County 52

Adjacent counties

 Benson County - north
 Eddy County - east
 Foster County - east
 Stutsman County - southeast
 Kidder County - south
 Sheridan County - west
 Pierce County - northwest

Protected areas
Source:
 Karl T. Frederick State Game Management Area
 Upland State Game Refuge

Lakes
Source:

 Big Slough
 Crystal Lake
 Egg Lake
 Lake Ontario
 Silver Lake
 Sorenson Lake

Demographics

2000 census
As of the 2000 census, there were 5,102 people, 2,215 households, and 1,453 families in the county.  The population density was 4.01/sqmi (1.55/km2). There were 2,643 housing units at an average density of 2.08/sqmi (0.80/km2). The racial makeup of the county was 99.12% White, 0.14% Black or African American, 0.24% Native American, 0.24% Asian, 0.02% from other races, and 0.25% from two or more races. 0.29% of the population were Hispanic or Latino of any race. 59.5% were of German and 24.1% Norwegian ancestry.

There were 2,215 households, out of which 25.40% had children under the age of 18 living with them, 58.60% were married couples living together, 4.80% had a female householder with no husband present, and 34.40% were non-families. 32.60% of all households were made up of individuals, and 18.60% had someone living alone who was 65 years of age or older. The average household size was 2.25 and the average family size was 2.85.

The county population contained 22.50% under the age of 18, 4.60% from 18 to 24, 22.70% from 25 to 44, 24.20% from 45 to 64, and 26.00% who were 65 years of age or older. The median age was 45 years. For every 100 females there were 96.60 males. For every 100 females age 18 and over, there were 94.00 males.

The median income for a household in the county was $31,894, and the median income for a family was $39,284. Males had a median income of $27,277 versus $16,810 for females. The per capita income for the county was $17,932.  About 10.30% of families and 13.50% of the population were below the poverty line, including 11.10% of those under age 18 and 17.90% of those age 65 or over.

2010 census
As of the 2010 census, there were 4,207 people, 1,943 households, and 1,223 families in the county. The population density was 3.31/sqmi (1.28/km2). There were 2,481 housing units at an average density of 1.95/sqmi (0.75/km2). The racial makeup of the county was 98.9% white, 0.3% American Indian, 0.1% black or African American, 0.1% Asian, 0.0% from other races, and 0.6% from two or more races. Those of Hispanic or Latino origin made up 0.5% of the population. In terms of ancestry, 65.9% were German, 25.9% were Norwegian, 6.7% were Irish, and 1.8% were American.

Of the 1,943 households, 19.7% had children under the age of 18 living with them, 54.1% were married couples living together, 5.6% had a female householder with no husband present, 37.1% were non-families, and 34.3% of all households were made up of individuals. The average household size was 2.10 and the average family size was 2.67. The median age was 51.5 years.

The median income for a household in the county was $40,136 and the median income for a family was $52,400. Males had a median income of $38,442 versus $25,597 for females. The per capita income for the county was $23,531. About 6.1% of families and 10.3% of the population were below the poverty line, including 12.5% of those under age 18 and 17.1% of those age 65 or over.

Communities

Cities

 Bowdon
 Cathay
 Fessenden (county seat)
 Hamberg
 Harvey
 Hurdsfield
 Sykeston

Census-designated place
 Heimdal

Unincorporated communities

 Bremen
 Chaseley
 Dover
 Emrick
 Heaton (ghost town)
 Manfred

Townships

 Berlin
 Bilodeau
 Bremen
 Bull Moose
 Cathay
 Chaseley
 Crystal Lake
 Delger
 Fairville
 Forward
 Fram
 Germantown
 Haaland
 Hamburg
 Hawksnest
 Heimdal
 Hillsdale
 Johnson
 Lynn
 Manfred
 Norway Lake
 Oshkosh
 Pony Gulch
 Progress
 Rusland
 Saint Anna
 Silver Lake
 South Cottonwood
 Speedwell
 Sykeston
 Valhalla
 Wells
 West Norway
 West Ontario
 Western
 Woodward

Politics
Wells County voters have been Republican-leaning for several decades. In no national election since 1964 has the county selected the Democratic Party candidate.

See also
 National Register of Historic Places listings in Wells County, North Dakota

References

External links
 Wells County official website
 Northern portion of Wells County, North Dakota DOT
 Southern portion of Wells County, North Dakota DOT

 
1884 establishments in Dakota Territory
Populated places established in 1884